1061 Paeonia, provisional designation , is a carbonaceous background asteroid from the outer regions of the asteroid belt, approximately  in diameter. It was discovered on 10 October 1925, by German astronomer Karl Reinmuth at the Heidelberg-Königstuhl State Observatory in Heidelberg, Germany. The C-type asteroid has a rotation period of 8 hours and is likely very elongated. It was named after the flowering plant Paeonia, commonly known as peony.

Orbit and classification 

Paeonia is a non-family asteroid of the main belt's background population when applying the hierarchical clustering method to its proper orbital elements. Based on osculating Keplerian orbital elements, the asteroid has also been classified as a member of the Themis family, a very large family of carbonaceous asteroids, named after 24 Themis.

It orbits the Sun in the outer asteroid belt at a distance of 2.5–3.8 AU once every 5 years and 6 months (2,017 days; semi-major axis of 3.12 AU). Its orbit has an eccentricity of 0.22 and an inclination of 2° with respect to the ecliptic. The asteroid was first observed at the Simeiz Observatory in September 1925. The body's observation arc begins at Yerkes Observatory in November 1925, or one month after its official discovery observation at Heidelberg.

Naming 

This minor planet was named after the genus of flowering plants, Paeonia, which comprises all perennial peony plants. The official naming citation was mentioned in The Names of the Minor Planets by Paul Herget in 1955.

Reinmuth's flowers 

Due to his many discoveries, Karl Reinmuth submitted a large list of 66 newly named asteroids in the early 1930s. This list also contained a sequence of 28 asteroids, starting with 1054 Forsytia, that were all named after plants, in particular flowering plants (also see list of minor planets named after animals and plants).

Physical characteristics 

In the Tholen classification, Paeonia is a common, carbonaceous C-type asteroid, which agrees with the overall spectral type for the Themistians.

Rotation period and pole 

In December 1986, a rotational lightcurve of Paeonia was obtained from photometric observations by American physicist Frederick Pilcher at Illinois College. Lightcurve analysis gave a rotation period of at least 6 hours with a brightness amplitude of 0.5 magnitude. Only a lower limit could be determined due to the short observation period. The observer noted that the brightness variation occurred within 2 hours or less. In 2014, Pilcher revisited Paeonia at his Organ Mesa Observatory  and measured a refined period of 7.9971 hours with an amplitude of 1.00 magnitude, a strong indication for an elongated shape.

A modeled lightcurve using photometric data from the Lowell Photometric Database was published in 2016. It gave an identical sidereal period of 7.9971 hours, as well as a spin axis at (155.0°, −50.0°) in ecliptic coordinates (λ, β).

Diameter and albedo 

According to the survey carried out by the NEOWISE mission of NASA's Wide-field Infrared Survey Explorer, Paeonia measures between 18.63 and 23.092 kilometers in diameter and its surface has an albedo between 0.048 and 0.09. The Collaborative Asteroid Lightcurve Link assumes an albedo of 0.08 and calculates a diameter of 17.95 kilometers based on an absolute magnitude of 12.09.

Notes

References

External links 
 Lightcurve Database Query (LCDB), at www.minorplanet.info
 Dictionary of Minor Planet Names, Google books
 Asteroids and comets rotation curves, CdR – Geneva Observatory, Raoul Behrend
 Discovery Circumstances: Numbered Minor Planets (1)-(5000) – Minor Planet Center
 
 

001061
Discoveries by Karl Wilhelm Reinmuth
Named minor planets
001061
19251010